Chad was divided into 14 prefectures from 1960, the year of independence, to 1999, when the country was divided in 28 departments. A further reorganisation in 2002 divided the country into the current 18 regions.

NB : Alphabetic order

 
Subdivisions of Chad
Chad, Prefectures
Prefectures